Sachin Hewawasam (born 15 June 1994) is a Sri Lankan cricketer. He made his first-class debut for Badureliya Sports Club in the 2015–16 Premier League Tournament on 8 January 2016.

References

External links
 

1994 births
Living people
Sri Lankan cricketers
Badureliya Sports Club cricketers
Cricketers from Colombo